Salem Gamal Mohammed Ali Al-Harsh (born October 7 1998) is a Yemeni professional footballer who plays as a goalkeeper for Yemeni club Al-Wehda Aden and the Yemen national team.

International career
Al-Harsh was part of the Yemeni squad that played at the 2019 AFC Asian Cup.

References 

1998 births
Living people
Al-Wehda SC (Aden) players
Yemeni footballers
Yemen international footballers
Association football goalkeepers
Yemeni League players
2019 AFC Asian Cup players